The role of veterinary nurses in Australia is to assist the veterinary surgeons in their duties, and to perform animal health-care activities to provide care for their patients.

The title of veterinary nurse is not a protected title in Australia, and it is common for veterinary practices to hire nurses without any qualifications. There are certifications available that provide training and qualifications to veterinary nurses, such as a Certificate IV in Veterinary Nursing or Bachelor of Veterinary Technology. Certified nurses can undertake further study through an Advanced Certificate in Veterinary Nursing (Surgical, ECC or Clinical), or the Diploma of Veterinary Nursing.

Veterinary nurses exhibiting excellence in their field and completing continual professional development may be recognised jointly by the Veterinary Nurses Council of Australia (VNCA) and the Australian Veterinary Association (AVA) with the post-nominal letters AVN (Accredited Veterinary Nurse).

Registration 
Throughout the majority of Australia, veterinary nurses do not have to be registered with a board in order to practise. Through the Veterinary Nurses Council of Australia (VNCA), there is an optional registration through the Australian Veterinary Nurse and Technician (AVNAT) scheme, launched on April 1st, 2019. 

Nurses can become a Registered Veterinary Nurse (RVN) with the VNCA, through completion of one of the following:

 Certificate IV in Veterinary Nursing (Australia)
 Diploma in Veterinary Nursing Level 3 (United Kingdom)
 Diploma in Veterinary Nursing (New Zealand)
 CVMA-accredited college qualifications (Canada)

Alternatively, technicians can become a Registered Veterinary Technician (RVT) with the VNCA, through completion of one of the following:

 Bachelor of Veterinary Technology (University of Queensland)
 Bachelor of Veterinary Technology (Charles Sturt University)
 Veterinary technician degree and completion of VNTE examinations (USA)

Western Australia 
In Western Australia, it is a requirement that all practising veterinary nurses must be registered with the Veterinary Surgeon's Board of Western Australia. A Certificate IV in Veterinary Nursing must be held in order to be registered with the Board. The Veterinary Surgeons Regulations 1979 regulates what acts a veterinary nurse can legally perform, and all nurses registered with the Board must comply with both the Regulations and the Act.

References

External links
Veterinary Nurses Council of Australia
Australian Veterinary Association
Veterinary Surgeon's Board Western Australia

Australia
Veterinary medicine in Australia